
This is a list of aircraft in numerical order of manufacturer followed by alphabetical order beginning with 'M'.

Mv

MVEN 
 MVEN Farmer-2

MVP
(MVP – Most Versatile Plane)
 MVP Model 3

References

Further reading

External links 

 List of Aircraft (M)

fr:Liste des aéronefs (I-M)